"Good" is a song by American alternative rock band Better Than Ezra. It was released in February 1995 as the first single from their major-label debut album, Deluxe. It reached No. 1 on the Billboard Modern Rock Tracks chart, No. 3 on the Billboard Mainstream Rock Tracks chart, and No. 30 on the Billboard Hot 100.

"Good" was featured in a trailer for the 1995 film The Baby-Sitters Club, the 1998 film Dirty Work and on an episode of Hindsight.

Composition

Kevin Griffin wrote the song in late 1990 or early 1991, just after he had graduated from LSU and had formed Better Than Ezra. It was a part of the band's set lists for several years before being released as a single in early 1995. His simple four-chord pattern and strong modulation was inspired by Bob Dylan's mastery of the three-chord structure, as well as alt-rock pioneers R.E.M. and the Pixies. "I wanted to talk about the positive things that come from the end of a relationship. There's always the hurt feelings and everyone's guarded and it can be traumatic, but when the dust settles, it was about looking at the good things - no pun intended - that you got from that relationship. How did you grow? What did you learn emotionally? And to experience some stuff. And in this case it was just kind of reflecting on how this person changed," said Griffin. He was in a happy relationship at the time, so the song wasn't personal experience, but he broke up shortly after.

Track listings and formats
US CD / Cassette Single
"Good"  – 3:05
"Circle of Friends" (Live Version) – 3:39

GER Maxi CD Single
"Good"  – 3:05
"Summerhouse" (Live Version) – 2:23
"Know You Better" (Live Version) – 4:32
"Circle of Friends" (Live Version) – 3:39

Charts

Weekly charts

Year-end charts

References 

Better Than Ezra songs
1993 songs
1995 debut singles
Songs written by Kevin Griffin